Hanro Jacobs (born ) is a South African rugby union player for the  in Super Rugby and the  in the Currie Cup. His regular position is prop.

Jacobs was named in the Sharks squad for both the Super Rugby Unlocked competition.

References

South African rugby union players
Living people
2000 births
Rugby union props
Sharks (rugby union) players
Sharks (Currie Cup) players
Cheetahs (rugby union) players